On , a mass shooting and robbery occurred at the Robinson Shopping Centre in the Lopburi province of Thailand. The gunman, Prasittichai Khaokaew, used a suppressed semi-automatic pistol to shoot seven people, killing three of them. He then stole ฿500,000 worth of gold jewelry before fleeing on a motorcycle. Khaokaew was arrested 13 days later on 22 January 2020. While in custody, he confessed to committing the robbery and shooting because he was in debt and wanted to make his life more exciting. He later pleaded guilty and was sentenced to death.

Robbery and shooting 
Khaokaew, wearing a balaclava and armed with a Czech-made CZ SP-01 semi-automatic pistol, entered the Robinson Shopping Centre at 8:44 pm. Outside of the Aurora gold shop, he shot Teerachat Nimma, a 33-year-old security guard. The guard limped out of the mall and died on a road adjacent to the building. He then shot a 2-year-old boy in the head. After falling to the ground, the boy's mother carried him to safety, but he later died from his injuries in the hospital. Khaokaew then entered the gold shop, where he fatally shot Thidarat Thongthip, a 31-year-old employee, behind the counter.

Khaokaew proceeded to jump over the counter and stole three trays of gold necklaces worth ฿500,000. Before the police arrived, he fled on a red-white Yamaha Fino motorcycle with its license plate removed. The Phahon Yothin Highway, where the mall was located, was temporarily closed that night.

Four others were injured in the shooting, including a couple who were shopping for jewelry with their daughter, and a foreign tourist.

Investigation 
The shooting caused outrage throughout Thailand, and there was considerable public pressure to arrest the perpetrator. A ฿500,000 reward was offered for information leading to the arrest of the gunman. Sensitive information concerning the status of the investigation was leaked to the media by police officers, leading to fears that the perpetrator fled the country before he could be apprehended.

The police believed the perpetrator had experience using firearms due to his gestures during the shooting. Authorities learned that there were 13 guns matching the model of the one used during the shooting in the Sing Buri province. One of these guns belonged to the perpetrators father, a former policeman. Fingerprints and other DNA belonging to the assailant were also retrieved from the crime scene. Additionally, the shooter wore rare and expensive shoes, which were traced back to him. One week after the shooting, the perpetrator's wife gave the police a tip after she recognized the gunman's limp and the motorcycle he used.

After police learned of the shooter's identity, they collected shells from a gun range Khaokaew frequented. Some of the shells ballisticly matched those found at the crime scene.

Perpetrator 
Prasittichai Khaokaew (born 26 December 1981) lived with his wife of three years in the Lopburi province. Khaokaew was a head master of a primary school in the neighboring Sing Buri province, where he earned a monthly salary of ฿30,000. Other staff at the school described him as a friendly person who easily got along with others. He reportedly lived a luxury lifestyle, which caused him to amass ฿2,000,000 in debt. He was known to police because he had previously purchased an illegally imported BMW Z4 sports car. Khaokaew was also a gun enthusiast who owned several firearms.

Khaokaew claimed to have planned the crime three days in advance. He borrowed the gun used in the crime from his father and returned it to him the day after the shooting. He also purchased the silencer for the weapon online. The motorcycle he used to flee the scene was owned by his father-in-law. He discarded the clothes he wore at the Kok Ko tambon of the Mueang Lopburi district.

Khaokaew was arrested on the morning of  while driving on Highway 311 in his BMW 5 Series car. After his arrest, Khaokaew's wife went into hiding after being harassed and threatened. Khaokaew confessed to the murders, stating he committed them because he was bored with his life and wanted more excitement. However, he later retracted this statement, claiming he actually committed the crime because of his financial problems. He also stated that he dumped the gold he stole into a river. This was later proven false when investigators found the 33 gold necklaces hidden at his father's house.

Legal proceedings 
Khaokaew was charged with nine offenses including premeditated murder, attempted murder, illegally discharging a firearm in a public place, and illegal possession of weapons and ammunition. After hearing the charges, he pleaded guilty on all counts. He was later sentenced to death. Despite Khaokaew claiming the murders were not planned, the court argued that the use of a silencer proved that the crime was premeditated. They also noted that he did not turn himself in.

See also 

 Crime in Thailand
 List of massacres in Thailand
 Nakhon Ratchasima shootings

References 
Mass shootings in Thailand
2020 mass shootings in Asia
Attacks on shopping malls
2020 murders in Thailand
January 2020 crimes in Asia
Robberies in Asia
Deaths by firearm in Thailand
21st-century mass murder in Asia
Filmed killings in Asia
Attacks on buildings and structures in Thailand
Attacks on buildings and structures in 2020

Massacres in Thailand
Mass murder in 2020